Angels Fall is a 2007 American mystery thriller romantic drama television film directed by Ralph Hemecker and starring Heather Locklear and Johnathon Schaech. It is based on the 2006 Nora Roberts novel of the same name. The film is about a beautiful chef who moves to a small town in Wyoming after her Boston restaurant is shut down because of a fatal shooting. The film debuted January 29, 2007 on Lifetime Television. At the time, it was one of the top-ten watched telecasts in the history of the network.

Summary
Reece Gilmore (Locklear) is the sole survivor of a massacre at a Boston restaurant where she worked as a chef. After a stay in a mental hospital due to PTSD, anxious and restless, she hits the open road with no destination in mind, desperate for a fresh start. When her car breaks down in a picturesque Wyoming town, Reece takes a job cooking at the local diner to earn enough to repair it and move on. But as she gets to know the townspeople, mystery writer Brody (Schaech) in particular, she considers putting the past behind her and settling down.

But then, while out hiking, she witnesses a murder. Reece is traumatized again, and not just by the killing, but also because, when the police go to check out the crime scene, there's no evidence of a murder taking place. The townspeople doubt her story due to her past, which leads everyone, including Reece, to question her sanity.

Cast
 Heather Locklear as Reece Gilmore
 Johnathon Schaech as Brody
 Gary Hudson as Rick Marsden
 Derek Hamilton as Lo
 Linda Darlow as Joanie
 Lisa Marie Caruk as Linda Gail
 Len Crowther as Doc
 Pete Seadon as Mac Drubber
 Robert White as Lynt
 Christy Greene as Ginny
 Jemma Blackwell as Debbie Marsden
 Tamara Werden as Woman in Orange Hat
 Guillermo Ura as Serge
 Chezlene Kocian as Marlie
 Lori Ravensborg as Jeweler

Production
The film was executive produced by Stephanie Germain and Peter Guber, who also 'e.p.-ed' seven other Roberts films for Lifetime in 2007 and 2009.

Reception
Angels Fall was one of the top ten most-watched telecasts in the history of the channel.

References

External links
 
 
 
 

2007 television films
2007 films
2007 romantic drama films
2000s thriller films
2000s English-language films
Films based on works by Nora Roberts
Films directed by Ralph Hemecker
Lifetime (TV network) films
American romantic drama films
American mystery thriller films
American drama television films
American thriller television films
2000s American films